Blondelia nigripes is a species of fly in the family Tachinidae.

References

Diptera of Asia
Diptera of Europe
Insects described in 1810
Taxa named by Carl Fredrik Fallén
Exoristinae